Ode for St. Cecilia's Day (HWV 76) is a cantata composed by George Frideric Handel in 1739. The title of the cantata refers to Saint Cecilia, the patron saint of musicians.  The premiere was on 22 November 1739 at the Theatre in Lincoln's Inn Fields, London.

Words
Handel sets a poem which the English poet John Dryden wrote in 1687.
The main theme of the text is the Pythagorean theory of harmonia mundi, that music was a central force in the Earth's creation.

Music
Ebenezer Prout has commented on various facets of Handel's instrumentation in the work and Edmund Bowles has written on Handel's use of timpani in the work.

Movements
 Overture: Larghetto e staccato—allegro—minuet
 Recitative (tenor): From harmony, from heavenly harmony
 Chorus: From harmony, from heavenly harmony
 Aria (soprano): What passion cannot music raise and quell!
 Aria (tenor) and Chorus: The trumpet's loud clangour
 March
 Aria (soprano): The soft complaining flute
 Aria (tenor): Sharp violins proclaim their jealous pangs
 Aria (soprano): But oh! What art can teach
 Aria (soprano): Orpheus could lead the savage race
 Recitative (soprano): But bright Cecilia raised the wonder higher
 Grand Chorus with (soprano): As from the power of sacred lays

Texts

From Harmony (Recit)
TENOR: From harmony, from heavenly harmony
This universal frame began.
When nature, underneath a heap
Of jarring atoms lay,
And could not heave her head.
The tuneful Voice, was heard from high,
Arise! Arise!
Arise ye more than dead!
Then cold, and hot, and moist, and dry,
In order to their stations leap!
And music's power obey!
And music's power obey!

From Harmony (Chorus)
CHORUS: From harmony, from heavenly harmony,
This universal frame began.
Through all the compass of the notes it ran,
The diapason closing full in man.

What Passion Cannot Music Raise and Quell
SOPRANO: What passion cannot music raise, and quell?
When Jubal struck the chorded shell,
His listening brethren stood 'round.
And wondering on their faces fell,
To worship that celestial sound!
Less than a god they thought there could not dwell
Within the hollow of that shell
That spoke so sweetly and so well.
What passion cannot Music raise and quell?

The Trumpet's Loud Clangour
TENOR: The trumpet's loud clangour excites us to arms,
With shrill notes of anger and mortal alarms,
The double-double-double beat,
Of the thund'ring drum,
Cries hark! Hark! Cries hark the foes come!
Charge! Charge! Charge! Charge!
'Tis too late, 'tis too late to retreat!
Charge 'tis too late, too late to retreat!

The Soft Complaining Flute
SOPRANO: The soft complaining flute
In dying notes discovers
The woes of hopeless lovers,
Whose dirge is whispered by the warbling lute.

Sharp Violins Proclaim
TENOR:  Sharp violins proclaim,
Their jealous pangs,
And desperation!
Fury, frantic indignation!
Depth of pains, and height of passion,
For the fair disdainful dame!

But Oh! What Art Can Teach
SOPRANO: But oh! what art can teach,
What human voice can reach
The sacred organ's praise?
Notes inspiring holy love,
Notes that wing their heavenly ways
To join the choirs above.

Orpheus Could Lead The Savage Race
SOPRANO: Orpheus could lead the savage race,
And trees uprooted left their place
Sequacious of the lyre:
But bright Cecilia raised the wonder higher:
When to her Organ vocal breath was given
An Angel heard, and straight appeared –
Mistaking Earth for Heaven.

As From The Power Of Sacred Lays
SOPRANO: As from the power of sacred lays
The spheres began to move,
And sung the great Creator's praise
To all the blest above;
So when the last and dreadful hour
This crumbling pageant shall devour,
The trumpet shall be heard on high,

CHORUS: The dead shall live, the living die,
And music shall untune the sky

Recordings
Handel: Ode for St Cecilia's Day, (2003, CD): Felicity Lott, soprano; Anthony Rolfe Johnson, tenor; Crispian Steele-Perkins, trumpet; Lisa Beznosiuk, flute; The English Concert And Choir, conducted by Trevor Pinnock; Deutsche Grammophon — Archiv Produktion – 474 549-2
Händel: Ode for St Cecilia's Day, (1984/2008, CD): Monika Frimmer, soprano; Eberhard Bǔchner, tenor; members of the choir of the Landestheater Halle, of the Hallischen Chorsolisten and the Collegium vocale; the Händel-Festspielorchester Halle, conducted by Christian Kluttig; Berlin Classics  —  0013992BC

See also
 Hail! Bright Cecilia

References

External links
 
 Score from the Händel-Werkausgabe, ed. Friedrich Chrysander, Leipzig 1866

Cantatas by George Frideric Handel
1739 compositions
Choral compositions